The Narrow Street is a 1925 American silent comedy film directed by William Beaudine and starring Matt Moore.

Plot
As described in a review in a film magazine, Simon Haldane (Moore), the underdog in the office of the Faulkner Iron Works is efficient but absent-minded. He is the butt of the office staff jokes, so retiring that he is afraid of his own shadow, and intensely afraid of women. Doris (Devore), seeking to escape from detectives, hides in Simon's house and the next morning he is shocked to find her. A sudden chill causes him to call the Doctor (Orlamond) for her, and this starts a fast rumor that Simon is married. All is up in the air when the office force calls in for a body. Doris has taken a liking to Simon, and breezy salesman Ray Wyeth (Butler) takes a liking to her. An office shake-up results in Simon being made the manager. Returning home, the maid tells Simon that the young woman left with Ray. He later thoroughly trounces Ray and, after answering a telephone call directing him to go to a certain hotel, there he discovers that Doris is the daughter of his employer. He sheepishly starts to leave when she saves the situation.

Cast

Reception
According to Warner Bros. records, the film earned $219,000 in the United States and $40,000 in other markets. In 1930 it was remade as a talkie titled Wide Open starring Edward Everett Horton.

Preservation
While no prints of The Narrow Street are located in any film archives, a private collector reportedly has an incomplete copy.

References

External links

1925 films
1925 comedy films
Silent American comedy films
American silent feature films
American black-and-white films
Films directed by William Beaudine
1920s American films